A by-election was held for the New South Wales Legislative Assembly electorate of Kiama on 29 April 1864 because of the resignation of Samuel Gray to attend to his business interests.

Dates

Results

				
				

Samuel Gray resigned.

See also
Electoral results for the district of Kiama
List of New South Wales state by-elections

References

1864 elections in Australia
New South Wales state by-elections
1860s in New South Wales